The Ngang Pass (literally "Transverse Mountain Pass") is a mountain pass on the border of the provinces of Quảng Bình and Hà Tĩnh, in the North Central Coast of Vietnam. National Route 1 crosses it as it traverses the Hoành Sơn, a side-spur of the larger Annamite Range. The pass is 2,560 m long, ascending to the height of 250 m (750 ft).

Historical French texts refer to the pass as Porte d'Annam.

History
It marked the former boundary of Champa and Dai Viet until the 15th century when the Vietnamese pushed south and conquered the Cham lands piecemeal.

Controlling the strategic pass was a priority through the ages as the narrow neck of land could be choked off. At the summit of Ngang Pass remains the Hoành Sơn Quan (Transverse Mountain Gate), a masonry gateway built by Vietnam's last dynasty, the Nguyễn to regulate the foot traffic across the mountain.

The scenic pass is also well known in Vietnamese literature, its beauty having been sung by many writers, perhaps the most well-known is the poem by Bà Huyện Thanh Quan.

20th century
The pass was once a major hindrance to land transportation with its winding and steep grade. A modern tunnel has since bypassed the climb, shortening the driving time through the pass as well as making it safer for drivers. The serpentine road ascending the pass is now used by sightseers only.

See also
Hải Vân Pass

Landforms of Quảng Bình province
Mountain passes of Vietnam
Landforms of Hà Tĩnh province